The 2019 VOO-Tour de Wallonie was a five-stage men's professional road cycling race, held in Belgium as a 2.HC race on the 2019 UCI Europe Tour. It was the forty-sixth running of the Tour de Wallonie, starting on 27 July in Le Roeulx and finishing on 31 July in Thuin.

Schedule

Teams
Nineteen teams of seven riders entered the race. Of these teams, six were UCI WorldTour teams, ten were UCI Professional Continental teams, and three were UCI Continental teams.

UCI WorldTeams

 
 
 
 
 
 

UCI Professional Continental Teams

 
 
 
 
 
 
 
 
 
 

UCI Continental Teams

Stages

Stage 1
27 July 2019 — Le Roeulx to Dottignies,

Stage 2
28 July 2019 — Waremme to Beyne-Heusay,

Stage 3
29 July 2019 — La Roche-en-Ardenne to Verviers,

Stage 4
30 July 2019 — Villers-le-Bouillet to Lierneux,

Stage 5
31 July 2019 — Couvin to Thuin,

Classification leadership table
In the 2019 Tour de Wallonie, five different jerseys were awarded. The general classification was calculated by adding each cyclist's finishing times on each stage, and allowing time bonuses for the first three finishers at intermediate sprints (three seconds to first, two seconds to second, and one second to third) and at the finish of all stages to the first three finishers: the stage winner won a ten-second bonus, with six and four seconds for the second and third riders respectively. The leader of the classification received a yellow jersey; it was considered the most important of the 2019 Tour de Wallonie, and the winner of the classification was considered the winner of the race.

There was also a mountains classification, the leadership of which was marked by a white jersey. In the mountains classification, points towards the classification were won by reaching the top of a climb before other cyclists. Each climb was categorised as either first, or second-category, with more points available for the higher-categorised climbs.

Additionally, there was a points classification, which awarded a green jersey. In the points classification, cyclists received points for finishing in the top 10 in a stage. For winning a stage, a rider earned 25 points, with 20 for second, 15 for third, 10 for fourth and so on, down to 1 point for 10th place. There was also a separate classification for the intermediate sprints, rewarding a purple jersey. Points towards the classification were awarded on a 5–3–1 scale at intermediate sprint points during each stage; these intermediate sprints also offered bonus seconds towards the general classification as noted above.

Finally, the leader in the classification for young riders, wore a red bib number. This was decided the same way as the general classification, but only riders born after 28 July 1995 were eligible to be ranked in the classification. There was also a team classification, in which the times of the best three cyclists per team on each stage were added together; the leading team at the end of the race was the team with the lowest total time. A combativity award was also given each day to the most aggressive rider on that stage.

 On stage two, Roy Jans, who was second in the points classification, wore the green jersey, because first placed Timothy Dupont wore the yellow jersey as leader of the general classification.
 On stage three, Timothy Dupont, who was second in the points classification, wore the green jersey, because first placed Loïc Vliegen wore the yellow jersey as leader of the general classification.

Final classification standings

General classification

Points classification

Mountains classification

Sprints classification

Young rider classification

Teams classification

References

Sources

External links
  

2019
2019 UCI Europe Tour
2019 in Belgian sport
July 2019 sports events in Belgium